Patrick Georges Pillay is a Seychellois politician who was the Speaker of the National Assembly of the Seychelles from 2016 to 2018. Previously he served as Minister of External Affairs and Minister of Health. In 2010, he was appointed resident High Commissioner to the United Kingdom.

Standing in the September 2016 parliamentary election as a candidate of the opposition Linyon Demokratik Seselwa (LDS) coalition in Anse Boileau, located on Mahé, Pillay won a seat in the National Assembly. The LDS won a majority of parliamentary seats, and Pillay was elected as Speaker of the National Assembly on 27 September 2016.
Pillary resigned on 29 January 2018 from both the position as Speaker and member of the national assembly
 and Philip Arrisol won the seat in the resulting by-election.

References

Year of birth missing (living people)
Living people
Seychellois diplomats
Foreign Ministers of Seychelles
Health ministers of Seychelles
High Commissioners of Seychelles to the United Kingdom
Speakers of the National Assembly (Seychelles)
Seychellois people of Indian descent